Roqq-e Annabi (also Romanized as Roqq-e ‘Annābī) is a village in Kahshang Rural District, in the Central District of Birjand County, South Khorasan Province, Iran. At the 2016 census, its population was 12, in 5 families.

References 

Populated places in Birjand County